Bathymyrus echinorhynchus is an eel in the family Congridae (conger/garden eels). It was described by Alfred William Alcock in 1889. It is a tropical, marine eel which is known from the Arabian Sea, in the northern and western Indian Ocean.

References

Congridae
Fish described in 1889